Rashad Fenton (born February 17, 1997) is an American football cornerback for the Atlanta Falcons of the National Football League (NFL). He played college football at South Carolina. He was drafted by the Kansas City Chiefs in the sixth round of the 2019 NFL Draft.

Early years
Fenton played high school football at Miami Carol City in Miami Gardens, Florida, for coach Aubrey Hill, who was coached by Steve Spurrier.

Fenton was ranked as a high end three-star recruit by major recruiting services such as ESPN, 247Sports, and Rivals and held numerous Power 5 offers. Fenton chose South Carolina Gamecocks football over Florida and Louisville.

College career
Fenton played four years of college football at the University of South Carolina. Fenton was a solid cover corner who has appeared in 48 games while making 30 starts. Fenton recorded 122 tackles, five interceptions, 24 passes defended, one forced fumble along with one fumble recovery. Fenton logged a 24.8-yard career kick return average, second in school history, including one kickoff return for a touchdown.

Fenton started off his college football career for the 2015 South Carolina Gamecocks football team as a true freshman seeing limited time and returning kicks. Coach Steve Spurrier resigned mid-season as well.

For the 2016 South Carolina Gamecocks football team as a true sophomore, Fenton appeared in 12 games with seven starts for first year coach Will Muschamp. For the season Fenton logged 38 tackles, 1.5 tackles for loss, a half a sack, one forced fumble, five pass breakups, and one interception

Prior to his senior campaign the 2018 season, Fenton was named to Athlon Sports’ 2018 pre-season fourth-team All-SEC unit. During his senior season in 2018 he was generally considered the Gamecocks top cover corner. Fenton also split his season playing time at nickel and safety during the 2018 season while starting 12 of 13 games. Fenton recorded 34 tackles with 2.5 tackles for loss, six pass breakups, and 3 interception (tied for seventh in the SEC). In fact, Fenton had interceptions in three consecutive SEC games, picking off Georgia’s Jake Fromm, Vanderbilt’s Kyle Shurmur and Kentucky’s Terry Wilson. Fenton was nominated by his peers and received the “Unselfish Teammate Award” in 2018.

Professional career

Kansas City Chiefs

2019

Fenton was drafted by the Kansas City Chiefs in the sixth round with the 201st overall pick in the 2019 NFL Draft. In Week 11 against the Los Angeles Chargers on Monday Night Football, Fenton recorded his first career interception off Philip Rivers in the 24–17 win. In Week 13 against the Oakland Raiders, Fenton forced a fumble during a kickoff return on Trevor Davis which was recovered by teammate Dorian O'Daniel in the 40–9 win.

In the Divisional Round of the playoffs against the Houston Texans, Fenton recorded a sack on wide receiver Kenny Stills during the 51–31 win. Fenton won Super Bowl LIV with the Chiefs after they defeated the San Francisco 49ers by a score of 31–20.

2020
Fenton appeared in all 16 regular season matchups. In Week 4 against the New England Patriots, Fenton recorded his first interception of the season during the 26–10 win.  He injured both of his ankles following the Chiefs' Week 17 loss to the Los Angeles Chargers, causing him to miss the Divisional Round win over the Cleveland Browns. He returned for the 2020 AFC Championship game, where he intercepted Buffalo Bills' quarterback Josh Allen in the red zone off a deflection, and returned it 30 yards to preserve a 16-point fourth quarter lead.  It was Allen's first career red zone interception in three seasons of being a starter.  The Chiefs would go on to win the game to advance to Super Bowl LV where they would lose 31-9 to the Tampa Bay Buccaneers.

Atlanta Falcons
Fenton was traded to the Atlanta Falcons on November 1, 2022, in exchange for a conditional seventh-round selection in the 2023 NFL Draft.

References

External links
Kansas City Chiefs bio
South Carolina Gamecocks bio

1997 births
Living people
American football cornerbacks
Kansas City Chiefs players
Atlanta Falcons players
Players of American football from Miami
South Carolina Gamecocks football players
Miami Carol City Senior High School alumni